Napoleon Road (French: La route Napoléon) is a 1953 French comedy film directed by Jean Delannoy and starring Pierre Fresnay, Henri Vilbert and Claude Laydu. It was partly shot at the Billancourt Studios in Paris. The film's sets were designed by the art director Serge Piménoff.

Synopsis
A chancer organises a series of package tours along a route said to have been taken by Napoleon in 1815 when in fact the Emperor never set foot there. The local inhabitants back up his story as they hope to cash in on the tourist boom.

Cast
 Pierre Fresnay as Édouard Martel
 Henri Vilbert as Blaise
 Claude Laydu as Pierre Marchand
 René Génin as Le curé
 Mireille Ozy as Stella
 Raphaël Patorni as Bonvent
 Fernand Sardou as Le maire de Bourg-sur-Bléone
 Henri Arius as Le boucher
 Fransined as 	Le pharmacien
 Nicolas Amato as 	Figuières
 Maurice Bénard as 	Le ministre
 Pierrette Caillol as 	La femme dudocteur
 Lucien Callamand as 	Sabatier- le garde-champêtre
 Serge Davin as Cabanis - le coiffeur
 Germaine de France as 	Madame Martel
 Jean Landier as 	Emery
 Julien Maffre as 	Un habitant
 Denise Precheur as	Une employée
 Annie Roudier as 	Delphine
 Hélène Tossy as 	La postière
 Edmond Verva as 	Le père du jeune Victor
 Claude Laydu as Pierre Marchand
 Jean Panisse as 	Raphaël 
 Marie Albe as Clarisse - la journaliste

References

External links

1953 films
1953 comedy films
1950s French-language films
Films directed by Jean Delannoy
Films with screenplays by Roland Laudenbach
French comedy films
French black-and-white films
Pathé films
Films shot at Billancourt Studios
Films set in Paris
1950s French films